The following is a list of people from Laval, Quebec.

A
Hicham Aaboubou, Moroccan footballer
Vincent Auclair, politician
Donald Audette, ice hockey player

B
Simon Benoît, ice hockey player
Rachid Badouri, comedian
Martine Beaugrand, politician
Martin Bédard, football player
Annie Bellemare, figure skater
Didier Bence, heavyweight boxer
Jonathan Bernier, ice hockey goaltender
Raymond Berthiaume, jazz musician
Michael Bossy, ice hockey player
Dino Bravo, wrestler
Adolfo Bresciano, wrestler

C
 Jos Canale, ice hockey coach
 Robert Carrier
 Gregory Chamitoff, astronaut
 Grégory Charles, singer
 Josée Chouinard, figure skater
 Mathieu Chouinard, former ice hockey goaltender
 Maurice Clermont, former politician
 Charles Comeau, musician
 Michelle Courchesne, politician
 Michel Courtemanche, comedian

D
Alexandre Daigle, ice hockey player
Gerry Dattilio, former football player
Maud Debien, former politician
Yves Demers, former politician
Vincent Desharnais, ice hockey player
Alexandre Despatie, Olympic diver
Simon Després, ice hockey player
Danny Desriveaux, football player
Stéphanie Dubois, tennis player
Anthony Duclair, ice hockey player 
Alexandre Duplessis, politician
Pascal Dupuis, ice hockey player
Philippe Dupuis, ice hockey player

F
 Roseline Filion, diver
 Steven Finn, former ice hockey player
 Jean-François Fortin, ice hockey player
 Stéphane Fortin, former CFL player
 Pier-Luc Funk, actor

G
Hana Gartner, CBC broadcast journalist and host
Jean-Sébastien Giguère, ice hockey player
Jonathan Goldstein, author
Martin Grenier, ice hockey player

L
 Mylène Lamoureux, ice dancer
 Daniel Laperrière, former ice hockey player
 Linda Lapointe, former politician
 Alexandra Larochelle, author
 Pierre-Évariste Leblanc, late 19th- and early 20th-century politician, deceased 
 Sébastien Lefebvre, guitarist
 Félix Lengyel, professional esports player/Twitch streamer
 Carrie Lightbound, kayaker
 John Limniatis
 Yannick Lupien, swimmer

M
Nicolas Macrozonaris, sprinter
Frank Marino, guitarist
Guy Mongrain, former game show host and journalist
Hartland Patrick Monahan, retired ice hockey player.

O
Maryse Ouellet, WWE wrestler
Gédéon Ouimet, politician, deceased 
Joseph-Aldric Ouimet, politician, deceased

P
Jean Pascal, professional boxer
Alfred Pellan, painter, deceased 
Francine Pelletier, science fiction writer
Yves P. Pelletier, actor, director, writer, comedian
Eric Perrin, center for the Atlanta Thrashers
Carl-Olivier Primé, football player

R
Lucien Rivard, criminal
Yvon Robert, wrestler, deceased 
Frank Rochon, former ice hockey player

S
Clément-Charles Sabrevois de Bleury, 19th-century soldier, lawyer, politician and newspaper founder
Martin St. Louis, retired ice hockey player
Sandra Sassine, fencer
Eliezer Sherbatov (born 1991), Canadian-Israeli ice hockey player
Jeff Stinco, musician
Howard Stupp (born 1955), Olympic wrestler

T
Joseph Tassé, 19th-century writer, translator, and parliamentarian
José Théodore, retired NHL goalie
Jocelyn Thibault, retired NHL goalie

V
Jeannine Vanier, composer and organist
Liette Vasseur, biologist, President of the Canadian Commission for UNESCO
Tania Vicent, short track speed skater
Pascal Vincent, current head coach of the Manitoba Moose
Claude Vivier, composer and musicologist

Y
Joel Yanofsky, writer and columnist

Z
Sami Zayn, WWE wrestler

See also

List of people from Quebec
List of people from Quebec City
List of people from Montreal
List of people from Ontario
List of people from Toronto

Laval
 
Laval